Osman Ismayil oglu Hajibeyov (February 18, 1924 – June 14, 1979) was a theatrical actor of Azerbaijan. He was awarded the title Honored Artist of the Azerbaijan SSR (1969), and was a winner of the Lenin Komsomol Prize (1967).

Life 
Osman Ismayil oglu Hajibeyov was born on February 18, 1924, in Shusha, Azerbaijan Soviet Socialist Republic, USSR in an intellectual family. After graduating from the seventh grade of high school in Baku, he entered the Azerbaijan State Theater School. From the first time he studied at the theater school, he performed on the stage of the Azerbaijan State Theatre of Young Spectators. When he graduated in 1942, he was sent to Azerbaijan State Theater of Young Spectators as an actor.

On December 25, 1969, Osman Hajibeyov was awarded the honorary title of "Honored Artist of the Azerbaijan SSR" in connection with the 50th anniversary of the Azerbaijan State Theatre of Young Spectators and for his contribution to the development of national theatrical art. The actor died on June 14, 1979, in Baku, Azerbaijan Soviet Socialist Republic, USSR.

Filmography 
 “O olmasın, bu olsun”

Family 
His brother Soltan Hajibeyov was composer and People's Artist of the USSR. Osman Hajibeyov was Uzeyir Hajibeyov's cousin.

See also 
 Soltan Hajibeyov

References

1924 births
1979 deaths
Recipients of the Lenin Komsomol Prize
Soviet stage actors
20th-century Azerbaijani male actors
Honored Artists of the Azerbaijan SSR
Soviet Azerbaijani people
Azerbaijani male film actors
Azerbaijani male stage actors